Begonia radicans, the shrimp begonia, is a species of flowering plant in the genus Begonia, native to southeastern and southern Brazil. It has gained the Royal Horticultural Society's Award of Garden Merit.

References

radicans
Endemic flora of Brazil
Plants described in 1831